Yuvan Shankar Raja (born 31 August 1979), is an Indian film score and soundtrack composer and singer-songwriter. He mainly scores music for Tamil films. Considered a versatile composer, he is particularly known for his use of Western music elements and often credited with having introduced hip hop to the Tamil film and music industry and started the "era of remixes" in Tamil Nadu. Yuvan has won two Filmfare Awards South, five Mirchi Music Awards South, four Vijay Awards and three Tamil Nadu State Film Awards.

Within a span of 25 years, Yuvan has worked on over 100 films. Being the youngest son of composer Ilaiyaraaja, he began his musical career in 1996, at the age of 16, when he composed the film score for Aravindhan. He got his breakthrough with the Thulluvadho Ilamai (2002) soundtrack, and established himself as one of Tamil cinema's most sought-after composers by the mid-2000s. He won the Filmfare Award for Best Music Director – Tamil in 2004 for his score in the drama 7G Rainbow Colony. In 2006, he became the only Indian composer to win the Cyprus International Film Festival Award for the soundtrack of Raam. He also won the Filmfare Special Award – South in 2009 for his Telugu musical Oy!.

In 2015, Yuvan created his own music label, U1 Records and in 2017, he started his own film production studio, YSR Films.

Early life 
Yuvan Shankar Raja was born on 31 August 1979. He is the third and youngest child of musician and film composer Ilaiyaraaja. He is the younger brother of music director Karthik Raja and playback singer-music director Bhavatharini. Yuvan once confessed that his brother Karthik Raja was more talented than him, but he did not get a successful break into the music business since he did not get a "good team to work with". His father as well as his siblings have sung many songs under his direction. Film director and film composer Gangai Amaran and R. D. Bhaskar are his uncles and their sons Venkat Prabhu, Premgi Amaren and Parthi Bhaskar, who are working in the Tamil film industry as well, are his cousins.

Yuvan Shankar did his schooling at St. Bede's Anglo Indian Higher Secondary School in Chennai, and discontinued his education after his tenth class. He started learning music from Jacob Master, attending piano classes at "Musee Musical" in Chennai, which is affiliated to Trinity College in London, UK.

Yuvan Shankar Raja stated that he always wanted to become a pilot and travel "all around the world", but as he grew up "with music around him", he eventually became a musician. He admires the work of his father and other composers such as S. D. Burman, R. D. Burman, M. S. Viswanathan and Naushad Ali and the voices of singers Lata Mangeshkar, Asha Bhosle, P. B. Sreenivas, S. P. Balasubrahmanyam, and P. Susheela.

Career

Film score and soundtracks

Early years (1997–2000) 
In 1996, following his mother's suggestion to take up music as a profession, Yuvan Shankar Raja started composing tunes for an album. T. Siva, the producer of the Tamil language film Aravindhan, after hearing some of the tunes, asked him to compose a trailer music score. As Siva was impressed by the music, he gave Yuvan Shankar the assignment to compose the entire film score, including a soundtrack for that film. After consulting and getting consent from his parents, he accepted the offer; his music career started. His entry into the Tamil film and music industry had happened at age 16, thus he became one of the youngest composers ever in the industry, which he says, was "purely accidental".

However, both the soundtrack album as well as the film itself failed to attract audiences and do well, and Yuvan Shankar Raja's following projects Velai (1998) and Kalyana Galatta (1998) were not successful either; his compositions for these films did not receive good reviews or responses, with one reviewer labelling the music and background score in the latter as "cacophony" and "poor". The failures of his first projects meant that he was not offered any film projects and assignments subsequently. During this time of struggle, he was approached and assigned by director Vasanth to compose the music for his film Poovellam Kettuppar (1999). The soundtrack received a very positive response, being described as "fresh" and "different", with a critic from The New Indian Express citing that his "absolutely enchanting musical score [...] bears testimony to his "Raja" surname." The album became very popular, particularly songs such as "Irava Pagala" and "Chudithar Aninthu", gaining him first time notice, especially among young people and children. The album would make possible his first breakthrough in the industry and proved to be a major turning point in his career. After working for two Sundar C. films, Unakkaga Ellam Unakkaga (1999) and Rishi (2000), he got to work for A. R. Murugadoss's directorial debut in 2000, the action flick Dheena, starring Ajith Kumar, which went on to become a blockbuster and Yuvan Shankar Raja's first major successful film. Yuvan Shankar's songs were equally successful, which are considered to have played a major role in the film's great success, while his background score in the film was also well appreciated.

Rise to prominence (2001–2003) 
In 2001, he had three album releases, the first being Thulluvadho Ilamai, collaborating with Selvaraghavan for the first time. The film was directed by Kasthuri Raja, but his son Selvaraghavan wrote the script and worked with Yuvan Shankar Raja for the film's soundtrack album. The soundtrack album of Thulluvadho Ilamai particularly appealed to the younger generation. The film itself, marking the debut of Selvaraghavan's brother Dhanush, released one year later and became a sleeper hit at the Chennai box office. This was followed by Bala's Nandha (2001), for which he received rave reviews. He then gained notice by churning out "youthful music" in the college-life based April Maadhathil (2002), the romantic comedy films Kadhal Samrajyam (2002) (The film was never released theatrically, the soundtrack was released in 2002) and Mounam Pesiyadhe (2002), Ameer's directorial debut film, and the triangular love story Punnagai Poove (2002), in which he also made his on-screen debut, appearing in some scenes and one song sequence. At the same time, he made his Telugu debut with Seshu and Malli Malli Chudali and also composed for the Tamil films Junior Senior and Pop Carn, starring Malayalam actors Mammootty and Mohanlal, respectively, though all of which performed poorly at the box office.

In 2003, Selvaraghavan's first independent directorial, the drama-thriller film Kaadhal Kondein released, which is considered a milestone for Yuvan Shankar Raja. His work in the film, particularly his background score, was unanimously praised, leading to the release of a separate CD consisting of several film score pieces, à la "Hollywood-style", which was reportedly the first film score CD release in India. Furthermore, the film went on to become a blockbuster, cementing the film's lead artist Dhanush and Yuvan Shankar in the Tamil film and music industry. The same year, he worked in Vishnuvardhan's debut film Kurumbu, which featured the first remix song in a Tamil film. By that time, in a career spanning less than a decade, Yuvan Shankar Raja had established himself as one of the leading and most-sought after music directors in the Tamil film industry, despite having worked predominantly with newcomers and in low-budget productions.

Peak Success (2004–2007) 
Yuvan Shankar's 2004 releases, 7G Rainbow Colony, another Selvaraghavan film, and Silambarasan's Manmadhan, were both critically and commercially successful films, featuring acclaimed as well as popular music by Yuvan Shankar Raja, which also contributed to the films' successes. His work in the former, in particular, got critically acclaimed and eventually led him to win the Best Music Direction Award at the 2004 Filmfare Awards South; receiving the award at the age of 25, he was the youngest winning music composer of the award at that time. For the next several years, he would have nine to ten releases every year on average, making him one of the most prolific film composers of India.

His first of nine album releases of 2005 was Raam. His score for the Ameer-directed thriller, labelled as "soul-stirring", fetched him further accolades and eventually yielded a win at the 2006 Cyprus International Film Festival for Best Musical score in a Feature Film, the first such award for an Indian composer. His successful streak continued with his following releases of that year, the low-budget films Arinthum Ariyamalum, Kanda Naal Mudhal and Sandakozhi becoming successful ventures at the box office; Yuvan Shankar's songs, "Theepidikka", "Panithuli" and "Dhavani Potta" from the respective soundtracks enjoyed popularity and were said to have played an important role in the films's successes. After the release of the soundtrack for the S. J. Suryah-starring romantic comedy Kalvanin Kadhali, that also enjoyed popularity after the film's release, his final album of 2005, Pudhupettai, released, which saw him once again collaborating with director Selvaraghavan. The ten-track experimental album, receiving high critical acclaim, was considered Yuvan Shankar Raja's finest work till then and a "musical masterpiece". The soundtrack and score of the film featured a traditional orchestral score played by the "Chapraya Symphony" of Bangkok, for the first time in a Tamil film. Critics felt that this project, in particular, proved his abilities and talent to produce innovative and experimental scores as well. The film itself, releasing only in May 2006, did average business, despite opening to outstanding reviews.

He next worked on the romantic comedies Happy and Azhagai Irukkirai Bayamai Irukkirathu and the gangster film Pattiyal, which all released in early 2006. His Happy songs and score received positive reviews, with critics labelling the "youthful music" as "excellent", and the film's "main strength", while his score for Pattiyal was highly praised by critics; a Sify reviewer wrote: "Yuvan Shankar Raja's music and background score is the life of the film". Furthermore, both films went on to become very successful ventures, both commercially and critically. His subsequent releases that year include Silambarasan's directorial debut Vallavan and the action entertainer Thimiru. Yuvan Shankar Raja was cited as the "real hero" of the former, which featured some of the year's most listened-to tracks such as "Loosu Penne" and "Yammadi Aathadi", while the latter film ranked amongst the year's highest-grossing films. In November 2006, the Paruthiveeran soundtrack album got released, which saw the composer foraying into pure rural folk music, using traditional musical instruments. Though initially releasing to mixed reviews, with critics doubting whether the songs could attract a modern youth audience, his first attempt at rural music turned out to be a major success, following the film's outstanding run at the box office. The film, Ameer's third feature film as well as Karthi's debut venture, received universal critical acclaim after its release in February 2007 and became a blockbuster, while particularly the song "Oororam Puliyamaram" was a chartbuster number in Tamil Nadu.

In 2007, he had a record ten album releases in one year. The first was the soundtrack of the romantic drama film Deepavali, following which the audios of the sports comedy film Chennai 600028, the Telugu family entertainer Aadavari Matalaku Ardhalu Verule, Vasanth's bilingual thriller film Satham Podathey (Kelkaatha Shabdam in Malayalam) and the romantic films Thottal Poo Malarum and Kannamoochi Yenada released, with the former three being well-received besides garnering positive reviews. The films Chennai 600028, Venkat Prabhu's directorial debut, and Aadavari Matalaku Ardhalu Verule, Selvaraghavan's Telugu debut, in particular, were great commercial successes and became some of the year's most successful films in Tamil and Telugu, respectively. In late 2007, the film Kattradhu Thamizh and its soundtrack  got released. The soundtrack album, which was released as Tamil M. A., as well as the film itself, had been met with positive reviews and critical acclaim. The music was called a "musical sensation" and was noted to be a "proof" of Yuvan Shankar Raja's "composing skills". However, despite positive reviews by critics, the film failed to evoke the interest of the audience and did not enjoy much popularity. His final release of 2007 was Billa, a remake of the 1980 Rajinikanth-starrer of the same title. This film, remade by Vishnuvardhan, starring Ajith Kumar in the title role, also featured two remixes from the original version. The film emerged one of the top-grossers of the year, while also fetching positive reviews for Yuvan Shankar's stylish musical score.

More achievements (2008–2012) 

In 2008, five films, featuring Yuvan's music were released, two of them being the Tamil and Kannada remakes of Aadavari Matalaku Ardhalu Verule, titled Yaaradi Nee Mohini and Anthu Inthu Preethi Banthu, respectively, which partly featured the original score and songs. The Tamil version, in particular, was able to repeat the success of the original film, emerging as a high commercial success, while yielding Yuvan his second Filmfare nomination. The other releases that year include Seeman's Vaazhthugal, Venkat Prabhu's comedy-thriller Saroja, Ajith Kumar's action thriller Aegan and Silambarasan Rajendar's masala flick Silambattam, out of which, Saroja and Silambattam proved to be successful at the box office, with Yuvan Shankar's score in the former and his songs in the latter garnering accolades and several awards at the 2009 Isaiyaruvi Tamil Music Awards. In 2009, nine of his soundtrack albums released. Excluding the romantic comedy Siva Manasula Sakthi, featuring his most popular song of the year "Oru Kal Oru Kannadi", all other films failed at the box office. Besides "Oru Kal", the songs "Siragual" (Sarvam) and "Aedho Saigiral" (Vaamanan) also became popular. He had provided a rural score again in Kunguma Poovum Konjum Puravum and a sarangi-based score for the urban action drama of Ameer's Yogi. His score for his Telugu romantic musical Oy! fetched him the Special Jury Award at the 2010 South Filmfare Awards.

In late 2009, the soundtrack album of Paiyaa released, which was regarded as a "blockbuster album" and a "magnum opus", as it went on to become highly popular, much prior to the film's release, and one of Yuvan Shankar Raja's biggest successes of his career. The song "Thuli Thuli" had become the first Tamil song to be featured in the India Top 20 list for April 2010, indicating that it was the most frequently played Tamil song on all Indian FM radio stations in the history of Tamil film music. The film itself became one of the highest earners of the year, particularly supported by Yuvan's score and songs. Along with Paiyaa, songs from three more films for which he composed music that year – Naan Mahaan Alla, Baana Kaathadi and Boss Engira Bhaskaran – featured among the Top 10 chartbusters of the year. In early 2010, he composed his first Bollywood song; "Haq Se", as part of the ensemble soundtrack of the film Striker, starring his close friend Siddharth, which received thoroughly positive reviews. In 2011, he teamed up with Silambarasan again for the anthology film Vaanam, with the song "Evan Di Unna Pethan" from the album, that was released as a single, gaining popularity. His next film was Bala's Avan Ivan; Yuvan's songs generally fetched positive reviews. He next composed a score that drew influence from several world music styles for the critically acclaimed independent gangster film Aaranya Kaandam, winning high praise from critics. He went on to work in Venkat Prabhu's action thriller Mankatha, his biggest project till date, and Vishnuvardhan's first Telugu venture Panjaa. His last two releases of 2011 were the soundtrack albums to the action-masala films Rajapattai and Vettai, both of which received mixed responses and failed to reach success. His 2012 works include Billa II, starring Ajith Kumar, Ameer's long-delayed Aadhi Bhagavan and Vasanth's Moondru Per Moondru Kadhal.

Yuvan Shankar Raja's collaborations with several film directors such as Selvaraghavan, Ameer Sultan, Vishnuvardhan, Venkat Prabhu and Linguswamy have always resulted in highly successful soundtracks. Likewise, he has often worked together with noted Tamil poet Vaali and young Tamil lyricists including Na. Muthukumar, Pa. Vijay and Snehan and came up with successful compositions.

Recent work (2013–Present) 

In 2013, hit movies such as Kedi Billa Killadi Ranga and Aarambam, which included also successful soundtracks released.
The soundtrack of the coming-of-age movie Thanga Meenkal fetched him positive reviews.

In 2014, nine movies, featuring Yuvan's music were released, two of them non-Tamil movies; the Telugu film Govindudu Andarivadele and the Hindi film Raja Natwarlal, which marked Yuvan's Bollywood debut. While Govindudu Andarivadele became one of the highest grossing Telugu films of 2014, Raja Natwarlal however, was a box office flop. The other releases that year, which included Thirudan Police, Anjaan and Poojai proved to be commercially successful, whereas Vanavarayan Vallavarayan released with positive reviews from critics. In Vadacurry, he has done only one song in the album. Vai Raja Vai released in 2015, whereas the visuals of Idam Porul Eval remain unreleased. The next year, he had only two movies, Masss and Yatchan, which were released. Both movies were, despite the hit of the audio album, commercially unsuccessful.

His next film was Dharmadurai, which marked the second collaboration with lyricist Vairamuthu and director Seenu Ramasamy after Idam Porul Eval, Dharmadurai, Chennai 600028 II, Nenjam Marappathillai, Yaakkai and Taramani were the movies scored by him in 2016. In 2017, three films, namely Sathriyan, Kadamban and Anbanavan Asaradhavan Adangadhavan, Raja Ranguski, Sandakozhi 2, Irumbu Thirai, Santhana Devan (upcoming film), Peranbu, Super Deluxe, Kolaiyuthir Kaalam, 1945, Pyaar Prema Kaadhal, NGK, Maari 2, Kanne Kalaimaane, Maamanithan, Khamoshi  have been released and all these films music were praised by critics and audience.

Other languages 
Besides Tamil films, he has also scored music for films in other South Indian languages. Around 35 of the Tamil films, for which he had composed music, were afterwards dubbed into Telugu, Kannada or Malayalam languages as were the respective soundtracks. Apart from these ones, he also worked "straightly" on Telugu projects such as Seshu, Malli Malli Chudali, Happy, Raam, Raju Bhai and Aadavari Matalaku Ardhalu Verule, making him a well-known popular composer in Andhra Pradesh, also. His Telugu album Oy! had become a grand success as it topped the charts for several weeks. Yuvan's Panjaa, which released in 2011, has created all-time records, creating new waves (trends) as a rocking album in Andhra Pradesh. Yuvan has signed up for a Hollywood animated film named Woolfell, presented by Haricane Studios in 2015.

Other work

Playback singing 
Besides scoring, Yuvan Shankar Raja is a noted playback singer as well. As of August 2011, he has sung over 80 songs, mostly his own compositions, and several times he recorded for his father Ilaiyaraaja and his brother Karthik Raja. He lent his voice first in 1988, when he was eight years old for a song in the film En Bommukutty Ammavukku, composed by his father. Since then, he frequently sang for his father in films such as Anjali (1990), Chatriyan (1990), Thalattu Ketkuthamma (1991), Friends (2001), Kaathal Jaathi (2002), Ramana (2003) and Neethane En Ponvasantham (2012). Under his brother's direction, he had sung in the films Naam Iruvar Namakku Iruvar (1998), Ullam Kollai Poguthae (2001) and Veyilodu Vilayadu (2012). He had also performed a song for the film Siddu +2 (2010), composed by his friend Dharan, and had lent his voice for the theme song for the World Classical Tamil Conference 2010, set to tune by A. R. Rahman. In 2013, he sang a song for Rahman in the film Maryan.

However, he is better known as a singer of his own compositions. Films, featuring some of his most popular songs as a singer, include Thulluvadho Ilamai, April Maadhathil, Pudhupettai, Pattiyal, Azhagai Irukkirai Bayamai Irukkirathu (in which he had sung all songs), Deepavali, Kattradhu Thamizh, Siva Manasula Sakthi, Sarvam, Paiyaa and Naan Mahaan Alla, the latter earning him a Filmfare nomination for the Best Male Playback Singer Award.

Non-cinematic output 
Aside from scoring film music and soundtracks, he also produces personal music albums from time to time. In 1999, he made the Tamil pop album The Blast, that contained 12 tracks, featuring vocals by Kamal Haasan, P. Unnikrishnan and Nithyashree Mahadevan. However, the album went downright unnoticed. In 2008, he started working on his second album, the rights of which had been acquired by Sony BMG. Reportedly a bilingual album, produced in both Tamil and Hindi, the album was never released.

In 2010, he joined hands with former President of India A. P. J. Abdul Kalam for a grand music video album titled "Song of Youth". The popular song of the same title, based on which the album is made, was written by Kalam and is set to tunes by Yuvan Shankar Raja, who, along with Kalam and many other celebrities from the field of sports and entertainment, will feature in the video as well. The album was made as a trilingual, produced in the three languages Tamil, Hindi and English, and remains also unreleased.

Concerts 
In January 2009, Yuvan had announced his first live performance, which was planned to be held at the Rogers Centre in Toronto, Canada on 25 April 2009. According to Yuvan, the show would have featured around 30 songs, sung by well-known singers and his father Ilaiyaraaja, as well as some stage dances in between, by actresses Sana Khan and Meenakshi. However, the concert had been postponed eventually, with Yuvan Shankar stating that he was working on novel ideas to make the show memorable and hence, postponed the concert. In October 2009, he announced that a world tour, titled "Oru Naalil", is planned with a three-hour stage show to be held in various cities all over the world. The tour began with a show on 1 December 2009 at the Sharjah Cricket Association Stadium in Dubai, United Arab Emirates, featuring performances by singers such as Shankar Mahadevan, Hariharan, Karthik, Harish Raghavendra and Silambarasan and professional dancers from Mumbai, which was expected to be followed by shows in Canada, the US and South Africa. Also, it was planned to conduct the shows in Muscat, Oman and Kuwait, but following the Dubai concert, the tour was cancelled.

In October 2010, Yuvan Shankar Raja disclosed that he had signed for his first live concert in Chennai. The event, named Yuvan – Live in Concert, which was sponsored, organized and later telecasted on STAR Vijay, was held at the YMCA Grounds, Nandanam, Chennai, on 16 January 2011. Additionally, a promotional music video, "I'll Be There for You", composed and sung by Yuvan Shankar himself, directed by Vishnuvardhan and shot by Nirav Shah was made, while STAR Vijay aired a 3-week, 14 episode serial on Yuvan Shankar Raja as a run-up to the concert.

On 16 February 2012, Techofes organized a live-in tribute concert for Yuvan Shankar Raja, where he also performed.

He performed at the inaugural Kuala Lumpur International Indian Music Festival 2012 held at the Bukit Jalil Stadium, Kuala Lumpur, Malaysia on 15 December 2012. A pre-launch event to promote the concert was held in Brickfields, Kuala Lumpur in the first week of September, where Yuvan Shankar Raja sang a couple of songs.

Music style and impact 
He has explored various genres, and experimented with new sounds. Yuvan Shankar Raja has not learnt Indian classical music, although he has used complex swara patterns and carnatic rāgas in several films, including Nandha and Thulluvadho Ilamai. Critics have noted that Yuvan Shankar Raja's music has a "youthful character to it", with his compositions in particular appealing to the younger generation.

Yuvan Shankar Raja started the "era of remixes"; "Aasai Nooru Vagai" from Kurumbu (2004) is considered as the first remix in a Tamil film, following which several composers began remixing Tamil film songs from the 1970s and 80s. He has experimented with the fusion of old songs with his own original compositions, mixing and incorporating parts of them into his songs, e.g., "Theepidikka" from Arinthum Ariyamalum (2005) and "Enga Area" from Pudhupettai (2005). In 2010, he and his friend and fellow actor Silambarasan released the song "Evan Di Unna Pethan" from the film Vaanam (2011) as a single, which generated the trend of releasing single tracks from film soundtracks in Tamil cinema several months prior to the actual release, although the first single in Tamil cinema had been released in 2001 already.

Personal life 
Yuvan Shankar Raja married his girlfriend Sujaya Chandran on 21 March 2005, at the Mayor Sri Ramanathan Chettiyar Hall in Chennai, India. Yuvan had met her in 2002 as a fan at a music cultural program in London and both fell in love later. Sujaya was a London-based singer and the daughter of Dr. C. R. Velayutham and Dr. Sarojini Chandran. They had a secret registered marriage in September 2003 in London, before the formal public wedding was held in 2005 with the consent of their parents. In August 2007, they filed for divorce with mutual consent, which was granted in February 2008, after 6 months. The reason for the divorce was cited to be "irreconcilable differences".

On 1 September 2011, he married Shilpa at the Tirumala Venkateswara Temple, Tirupati in Andhra Pradesh. The marriage was held in a simple ceremony with only family members and close friends being present. Shilpa was revealed to be a B.Pharm graduate from Australia. A wedding reception was arranged a day later in Chennai.

In February 2014, he announced through his Twitter account that he had embraced Islam. He legally changed his name to Abdul Haliq, but continues to use his original name professionally. On 1 January 2015, he got married for the third time to Zafroon Nisa. Yuvan and his wife had a baby girl on 7 April 2016.

Discography

As composer

Upcoming films

Web series

Lyricist

Playback singer

Filmography

Onscreen appearances

Producer

Non-film works

Independent works and music videos

Television 

Panchavarnakili
Ananda Bhavan
Senior Junior
Super Singer Junior Season 8

Theatre 

 2014 – Chicago

Awards 
Special Honours

Cyprus International Film Festival

South Indian International Movie Awards

Filmfare Awards South

Tamil Nadu State Film Awards

Vijay Awards

Other awards 
Vikatan Awards
Ananda Vikatan Award for Best Composer of the Year for Kattradhu Thamizh and Paruthiveeran(2007)
Ananda Vikatan Award for Best Male Playback Singer of the Year for "Neethane" (Sarvam) (2009)
Ananda Vikatan Award for Best Composer of the Year for Super Deluxe and Peranbu (2019)

Ananda Vikatan Cinema Awards Award for Best Music Director (Peranbu, Super Deluxe) (2019)
Big FM Tamil Entertainment Awards

 Most Entertaining Music Director of the Year Award for Paiyaa (2011)

 Big Tamil Melody Award for Most popular composer-director
 Big Tamil Melody Award for Best Background Score for Aaranya Kaandam (2011)
GAMA Tollywood Music Awards
Nominated, Best Music Director – Telugu for Govindudu Andarivadele (2015)
Isaiyaruvi Tamil Music Awards
 Isaiyaruvi Album of the Year – Paruthiveeran (2007)
 Isaiyaruvi Best Folk Song of the Year – "Oororam Puliyamaram" (Paruthiveeran) (2007)
 Miranda Crazy Song of the Year – "Saroja Saamaan Nikalo" (Chennai 600028) (2007)
 Isaiyaruvi Sensational Youth Album – Silambattam (2008)
 Crazy Song of the Year – "Where Is The Party" (Silambattam) (2008)
 Isaiyaruvi Best Remix Song of the Year – "Vechikkava" (Silambattam) (2008)
Jayam Charitable Trust Film Music Awards
 Best Sensational Musician (2007)
 Best Singer of the Year Special Award for "Arabu Naade" (Thottal Poo Malarum) (shared with Haricharan) (2007)
Mirchi Music Awards South
 Mirchi Music Award for Best Music Composer of the Year for "Oru Kal Oru Kannadi" (Siva Manasula Sakthi) (2009)
 Mirchi Music Award for Best Album of the Year for Paiyaa (2010)
 Mirchi Music Award for Mirchi Listeners' Choice – Best Song of the Year for "En Kadhal Solla" (Paiyaa) (2010)
 Mirchi Music Award for Mirchi Listeners' Choice – Best Album of the Year for Paiyaa (2010)
 Mirchi Listeners Choice of the Year – "Thuli Thuli" (Paiyaa) (2010)
Spell Bound 
 Best Music Director Award for Vallavan (2006)
Vijay Music Awards
 Best Singer with the Maximum Hits of 2010
 Popular Duet of the Year – "Idhu Varai" (Goa) (2010)
 Popular Song sung by a Music Director – "En Kadhal Solla" (Paiyaa) (2010)
Other honors

 Medimix-Dinakaran Best Music Director Award for Manmadhan (2004)
 GV South Indian Cinematographers Association (SICA) Best Music Director Award (2007)
 Cinema Rasigargal Sangam Best Music Director Award for Billa (2007)
 CJA Cine Critics' Best Music Director Award for Kattradhu Thamizh (2007)
 Swarna Saravanan Excellence in Music Award (2013)

References

External links 

1979 births
20th-century Indian singers
20th-century Indian male singers
21st-century Indian composers
21st-century Indian singers
21st-century Indian male singers
Bollywood playback singers
Filmfare Awards South winners
Indian male playback singers
Indian Muslims
Kannada film score composers
Living people
Loyola College, Chennai alumni
Indian male film score composers
Singers from Chennai
Tamil film score composers
Tamil musicians
Tamil Nadu State Film Awards winners
Tamil playback singers
Telugu film score composers
Telugu playback singers
Converts to Islam from Hinduism